The 1978 Idaho gubernatorial election was held on Tuesday, November 7,  and incumbent Democrat John Evans defeated Republican nominee Allan Larsen with 58.75% of the vote. It was the third consecutive win for the Democrats (1970, 1974, 1978), but the only significant victory for the party in Idaho in 1978.

Primary elections
Primary elections were held on Tuesday, August 8, 1978.

Democratic primary

Candidates
 John Evans, Malad, incumbent

Results
Evans ran unopposed in the Democratic primary. Elected lieutenant governor in 1974, he succeeded Cecil Andrus in January 1977, who left to become U.S. Secretary of the Interior in the new Carter Administration.

Republican primary
Entering the primary, Vern Ravenscroft and Butch Otter were the apparent front runners, but were upset by Larsen.

Candidates
Allan Larsen, Blackfoot, Speaker of the Idaho House of Representatives
Vern Ravenscroft, Tuttle, former state representative
Butch Otter, Caldwell, former state representative
Larry Jackson, Boise, state representative, former MLB pitcher
James Crowe, Coeur d'Alene, home builder
Jay Amyx, Boise, former mayor

Results

General election
The election was notable as it was the first time Idaho elected a governor from the Church of Jesus Christ of Latter-day Saints. Both major candidates were members, and through 2020, Evans remains the only Mormon to be elected governor in the state.

Candidates
Major party candidates
John Evans, Democratic
Allan Larsen, Republican 

Other candidates
Wayne Loveless, American

Results

References

1978
Idaho
Gubernatorial